The Eastern Kanagawa Line is a strategic railway project in Japan to improve the railway network connectivity and passenger convenience between the eastern Kanagawa Prefecture and Tokyo Metropolis. The new infrastructures of this project are constructed and owned by the Japan Railway Construction, Transport and Technology Agency (JRTT), which is an Independent Administrative Institution governed by the Ministry of Land, Infrastructure, Transport and Tourism, while operation is divided between Sagami Railway (Sōtetsu), JR East and Tōkyū Railways.

In its finalized form, the railway comprises 2 major portions:
It has entered service since 30 November 2019.
 Sōtetsu–Tōkyū Direct Line (相鉄・東急直通線, STDL): Connecting Sōtetsu and Tōkyū Railways with the new railroads, Sōtetsu Shin-Yokohama Line and Tōkyū Shin-Yokohama Line, constructed between Hazawa yokohama-kokudai and  via . This has entered service since 18 March 2023.

Background
Originally Sōtetsu, which was only operating within Kanagawa Prefecture and did not have any through service with other railway operators, was not interested in this plan, because a through service via Shin-Yokohama would divert passengers away from its  hub terminus. However, as the population decline led to ridership drop of Sōtetsu, the rail company became more favorable towards the plan which improves connectivity with the Tokyo Metropolis and Saitama Prefecture.

The new law also stipulates a model which separate the construction/maintenance (整備主体) and operation (営業主体) of infrastructure to different entities.

Under this new law, in June 2006, the Ministry of Land, Infrastructure, Transport and Tourism approved the initial maintenance and operation plans of the Sōtetsu–JR Direct Line (SJDL) and Sōtetsu–Tōkyū Direct Line (STDL) submitted by the Japan Railway Construction, Transport and Technology Agency (JRTT). The SJDL was green-lighted on 21 November 2006 and STDL on 11 April 2007.

Financing
The construction of the Eastern Kanagawa Line project was funded one third from the national coffer, one third from the local governments (both prefectural and municipal) and one third from private loan. The JRTT coordinated the construction of this project, owns the completed rail infrastructures and is responsible for its maintenance. Sōtetsu and Tōkyū collect the revenues from operating the railways owned by JRTT, then they pay JRTT a portion of that revenues for maintenance and loan reimbursement for this project.

Both Sōtetsu and Tōkyū Railways applied to Ministry of Land, Infrastructure, Transport and Tourism for additional fare charge of using the new railways because of the high cost of the construction and the drop of estimated ridership from the initial provision, resulted from the COVID-19 pandemic.

References

External links
 都市鉄道利便増進事業 神奈川東部方面線, Sōtetsu–JR Direct Line, Sōtetsu–Tōkyū Direct Line
 Operating entities:
 都心とつながる（都心直通プロジェクト）, Sagami Railway
 東急新横浜線, Tōkyū Railways
 Construction entities:
 神奈川東部方面線 | 建設中のプロジェクト, Japan Railway Construction, Transport and Technology Agency
 Governing entities served by the railways:
 神奈川東部方面線, Kanagawa Prefecture
 神奈川東部方面線の整備 - Yokohama Municipal Development Bureau

Rail transport in Kanagawa Prefecture
Sagami Railway
Lines of East Japan Railway Company
Lines of Tokyu Corporation